Imelda Lambertini (1322 – May 12, 1333) is the patroness of First Communicants.

Biography 
Imelda Lambertini was born in 1322 in Bologna, the only child of Count Egano Lambertini and Castora Galuzzi. Her parents were devout Catholics and were known for their charity and generosity to the underprivileged of Bologna. On her fifth birthday, she requested to receive the Eucharist; however the custom at the time was that children did not receive their First Communion until age 14. 

At age nine, she went to live with the Dominican nuns at Val di pietra, near Bologna. 

On May 12, 1333, the day of the vigil of the Ascension, she knelt in prayer and the "Light of the Host" was reportedly witnessed above her head by the Sacristan, who then fetched the priest so he could see. After seeing this miracle, the priest felt compelled to admit her to receiving the Eucharist. Immediately after receiving it, Imelda went back to her seat, and decided to stay after Mass and pray. Later when a nun came to get her for supper, she found her still kneeling with a smile on her face. The nun called her name, but she did not stir, so she lightly tapped Imelda on the shoulder, at which time Imelda collapsed to the floor, dead. Her remains are kept in Bologna at the Church of San Sigismondo, beneath the wax effigy of her likeness.

The cultus of Lambertini has grown so popular that a confraternity for First Communicants has been established in her honor and the last Eucharistc Congress held in Bergamo passed a petition for her canonization.

Beatification 
Lambertini was beatified by Pope Leo XII in 1826.

References 

1322 births
1333 deaths
14th-century Italian women
Italian beatified people
Italian children
People from Bologna
Roman Catholic child blesseds
Beatifications by Pope Leo XII
Venerated Catholics